FFH may refer to:

 FFH (band), an American contemporary Christian band
 Fairfax Financial Holdings, a Canadian financial holding company
 Far from Home (disambiguation)
 Federal Forest Highway, within United States National Forests
 Halifax-class frigate
 Spider-Man: Far From Home, a 2019 superhero film produced by Marvel Studios